La Fortaleza and San Juan National Historic Site in Puerto Rico is a World Heritage Site located in and near San Juan, Puerto Rico. It comprises a series of fortifications across two properties:

 La Fortaleza
 San Juan National Historic Site
Castillo de San Felipe del Morro
Castillo de San Cristóbal
El Cañuelo
San Juan City Walls

These structures were built between the 15th and 19th centuries to defend the city and harbor of San Juan and are examples of European military architecture adapted to port cities on the American continent. La Fortaleza was the first defensive fortification built for the city. The historic site also includes Castillo de San Felipe del Morro, Castillo de San Cristóbal, El Cañuelo, and three-fourths of the old city wall.

See also
 List of World Heritage sites in the United States
 List of World Heritage sites in North America
 List of World Heritage sites in the Caribbean

References

External links
 

 
Forts in Puerto Rico